Alani may refer to:

Alani (given name)
Alans, Ancient Iranian people of the North Caucasus.
Melicope, the Hawaiian plant known as Alani